Shiram Diana Atamaint Wamputsar (born May 12, 1972) is an Ecuadorian shuar politician. She has been a member of the National Assembly.

Life 
Atamaint was born in Sucúa in 1972 and she was the first of four children born to Bosco Atamaint and Aurora Wamputsar. Her parents were both teachers. She attended Río Upano School before she studied for a degree in commercial engineering at the University of Cuenca, graduating in 2003. She went on to gain a master's degree at the Latin American Faculty of Social Sciences.

At the age of 26, she began to work for a Project for the Development of the Indigenous and Black Peoples of Ecuador, funded by the World Bank. She visited communities in Provinces of Morona Santiago, Pastaza and Zamora Chinchipe, and she decided to be a politician.

She entered politics in 2003 as alternate deputy for Sandra Palacios. In the 2006 legislative elections, she was elected as a deputy of her home province of Morona Santiago as a Pachakutik Plurinational Unity Movement candidate. She joined the Ministry of Agriculture as the Undersecretary for the Amazon. She had become the first legislator of the Shuar people. She was unususual for being qualified technically and she had to persuade the voters that they could support a woman to take the role. During her time in Congress, Atamaint has on several occasions worn traditional costumes of the Shuar community.

In 2009, she was appointed undersecretary for the Amazon at the Ministry of Agriculture, but she resigned to participate as a candidate for assembly member in the legislative elections of the same year. In them she won a seat representing Morona Santiago for Pachakutik. 2

During the protests of the Shuar community at the end of 2009, she participated as a representative of the protesters in the dialogues with the central government.

In June 2012, the environment minister, Marcela Aguiñaga, tried to sue Atamaint for slander after the she said in an interview that the minister had diverted public funds to friends' accounts. The National Court of Justice asked the National Assembly to lift Atamaint's parliamentary immunity, but it rejected the request. The motion to deny the request was presented by Paco Moncayo and obtained 66 votes in favor, 36 against and 11 abstentions.

In 2013 she stood again for election with Francisco Eduardo Cedeno Miranda as her alternate.

There were five members of the council and two of them, Enrique Pita and José Cabrera, supported her election while the other two, Luis Verdezoto and Esthela Acero did not.

In February 2019 Marlon Santi, coordinator of the distanced himself and his party from Atamaint as the did not agree with her policies as the President of the National Electoral Council.

In 2022 talks broke down between the executive and Confederation of Indigenous Nationalities of Ecuador's leader Leonidas Iza after the President said that talks were off. The President had meetings with Iza and others with mediation from church leaders. other leaders despite an attack on a military convoy in Orellana province. Atamaint (as president of the National Electoral Council), the National Assembly President Virgilio Saquicela and César Córdova of the CPCCS all called on the President for calm and to continue talks. Atamaint was clear that there were long standing demands that had to be resolved. She conceded that there had been violence during the recent national strike but she believed this was due to "private interests".

In July 2022 Atamaint was being impeached as it was alleged that the National Electoral Council had failed to investigate irregularities in the February 2021 general election. Charges were made against her and Esthela Acero, Enrique Pita, José Cabrera and Luis Verdesoto (even though he was no longer a councillor). Joel Abad and Mario Ruiz Jácome alleged that the council had not investigated inconsistencies in 39,000 ballot boxes. There were doubts as to whether the National Assembly's Oversight Commission were allowed to impeach the council. On 12 July a proposal to halt the impeachment process, made by Ana Belén Cordero, was accepted by the commission.

Private life 
She is divorced and they had two children.

References 

1972 births
Living people
People from Morona-Santiago Province
Women members of the National Assembly (Ecuador)